Laurie Mark Brown (born 1923, New York City) is an American theoretical physicist and historian of quantum field theory and elementary particle physics.

Biography
Brown studied at Cornell University, where in 1951 he received his Ph.D. under Richard Feynman. Since 1950 he has been on the faculty of the physics department of Northwestern University, where he became a tenured professor and eventually retired as professor emeritus. For the academic year 1952–1953 he was at the Institute for Advanced Study. For the academic years 1958–1959 and 1959–1960 he was a Fulbright Scholar in Italy. In 1966 he was an IEA professor at the University of Vienna. From 1960 to 1970 he served as a consultant for Argonne National Laboratory and the Laboratory's Accelerator Committee.

Brown is one of the leading science historians for the development of quantum field theory and elementary particle physics, especially in the era after 1945. During the 1990s one focus of his work was the history of modern physics in Japan.

He was the editor for Feynman's Thesis: A New Approach to Quantum Physics (2005), Selected Papers of Richard Feynman, with Commentary (2000), and (with John Rigden as co-editor) Most of the Good Stuff: Memories of Richard Feynman (1993).

Brown was one of the founders of the Forum on History of Physics of the American Physical Society and was the chair of the Forum in 1984 and again in 1989. He is a member of the American Association for the Advancement of Science and a member of the History of Science Society. In 1961 he was elected a Fellow of the American Physical Society.

Selected publications

as editor with Lillian Hoddeson: ; 
with Donald F. Moyer: 
with Max Dresden and Lillian Hoddeson: 
with Tian Yu Cao: 
as editor: 
as editor with Abraham Pais and Brian Pippard: 
with Helmut Rechendberg: 
as editor with Lillian Hoddeson, Michael Riordan, and Max Dresden:

References

1923 births
20th-century American physicists
21st-century American physicists
Quantum physicists
Theoretical physicists
Historians of science
Cornell University alumni
Northwestern University faculty
Fellows of the American Physical Society
Living people
Scientists from New York City